The 2012 European Women Sevens Championship was the tenth edition of the European Women's Sevens Championship.

Europe Emerging Nations 2012
Date/Venue: April 9, 2012 at Zanka, Hungary.
After a training camp (5–9 April), a tournament was played.

Group A

(*As an additional team, Poland II were automatically placed 5th in the pool)
Slovakia 0-47 Romania
Austria 5-12 Bulgaria
Romania 0-17 Poland II
Austria 36-0 Slovakia
Bulgaria 0-21 Poland II
Romania 52-0 Austria
Bulgaria 40-7 Slovakia
Austria 5-24 Poland II
Romania 39-0 Bulgaria
Poland II 44-0 Slovakia

9th/10th Place
Poland II 43-0 Barbarians
7th/8th Place
Slovakia 0-32 Czech Republic
Group B

Hungary 47-14 Czech Republic
Croatia 0-17 Poland
Czech Republic 36-0 Barbarians
Croatia 0-24 Hungary
Poland 60-0 Barbarians
Czech Republic 0-29 Croatia
Poland 14-21 Hungary
Croatia 45-0 Barbarians
Czech Republic 5-36 Poland
Barbarians 0-48 Hungary

5th/6th Place
Austria 0-35 Croatia
3rd/4th Place
Bulgaria 0-40 Poland
Final
Romania 26-19 Hungary

European World Cup Qualifier: Group A
Date/Venue: June 9–10, 2012 at Sofia, Bulgaria.

Group A

Latvia 26-0 Slovakia
Bulgaria 7-40 Hungary
Romania 55-0 Lithuania
Hungary 36-5 Slovakia
Latvia 38-0 Lithuania
Romania 48-0 Bulgaria
Lithuania 5-29 Slovakia
Romania 7-21 Hungary
Bulgaria 0-14 Latvia
Hungary 44-0 Lithuania
Bulgaria 21-7 Slovakia
Romania 28-0 Latvia
Bulgaria 15-5 Lithuania
Latvia 0-17 Hungary
Romania 63-0 Slovakia

Plate (5th-8th):

Semi-finals
Latvia 0-10 Austria
Bulgaria 0-31 Denmark

Final (5th/6th):
Austria 17-12 Denmark

7th/8th place:
Latvia 24-7 Bulgaria

Bowl (9th-12th):

Semi-finals
Slovakia 27-0 Bosnia & Herzegovina
Lithuania 15-0 Andorra

Final (9th/10th):
Slovakia 10-0 Lithuania

11th/12th place
Bosnia & Herzegovina 0-17 Andorra
Group B

 Denmark 0-35 Wales
 Austria 34-0 Andorra
 Croatia 38-0 Bosnia & Herzegovina
 Andorra 0-55 Wales
 Denmark 56-0 Bosnia & Herzegovina
 Croatia 29-0 Austria
 Bosnia & Herzegovina 0-75 Wales
 Croatia 51-0 Andorra
 Austria 7-10 Denmark
 Andorra 33-0 Bosnia & Herzegovina
 Austria 0-42 Wales
 Croatia 43-5 Denmark
 Austria 44-0 Bosnia & Herzegovina
 Denmark 32-12 Andorra
 Croatia 0-31 Wales

Cup (1st-4th):

Semi-finals
Hungary 7-14 Croatia
Wales 46-0 Romania

Final:
Croatia 0-49 Wales

3rd/4th place:
Hungary 5-33 Romania

European World Cup Qualifier: Group B
Date/Venue: June 9–10, 2012 at Ghent, Belgium.

Group A

 Scotland 59-0 Finland
 Norway 15-0 Malta
 Finland 0-45 Georgia 
 Norway 0-46 Scotland
 Malta 0-26 Georgia
 Finland 7-0 Norway 
 Malta 5-27 Scotland
 Norway 5-37 Georgia
 Finland 17-0 Malta
Georgia 7-21 Scotland

Plate (5th-8th):

Semi-finals
Finland 0-31 Poland
Norway 7-12 Czech Republic

Final (5th/6th):
Poland 12-17 Czech Republic (in extra time)

7th/8th place:
Finland 5-10 Norway

Bowl Final (9th/10th):
Malta 7-0 Israel
Group B

 Ireland 40-0 Czech Republic
 Belgium 17-12 Poland
 Czech Republic 36-5 Israel 
 Belgium 0-31 Ireland
 Poland 12-0 Israel
 Czech Republic 7-33 Belgium
 Poland 0-43 Ireland
 Belgium 19-0 Israel
 Czech Republic 5-5 Poland
Israel 0-55 Ireland

Cup (1st-4th):

Semi-finals
Scotland 26-7 Belgium*
Ireland 46-0 Georgia*

Final:
Scotland 0-29 Ireland

3rd/4th place:
Belgium 14-7 Georgia

European Women's Sevens Series: Round 1
Date/Venue: June 16–17, 2012 at Ameland, Netherlands.

Group A

 43 - 0 
 35 - 7 
 41 - 0 
 26 - 7 
 36 - 0 
 24 - 12 
 14 - 5 
 27 - 0 
 0 - 10 
 0 - 0 
 42 - 0 
 14 - 0 
 30 - 0 
 5 - 12 
 53 - 0 

Semifinals

Bowl

 19  - 0 
 5  - 40 

Plate
 36  - 0 
 10 - 7 

Cup
 24  - 7 
 5 - 14 
Group B

 0 -14 
 41 - 0 
 38 - 0 
 12 - 19 
 19 - 0 
 14 - 12 
 0 - 45 
 26 - 5 
 21 - 5 
 12 - 0 
 19 - 0 
 21 - 0 
 48 - 0 
 19 - 7 
 21 - 5 

Finals

Bowl
11th/12th:  7 - 10 
9th/10th:  5 - 10 

Plate
7th/8th:  7  - 33 
5th/6th:   33 - 0 

Cup
3rd/4th:  19 - 12 
1st/2nd:  21 - 10

European Women's Sevens Series: Round 2 & World Cup final qualifier
Date/Venue: June 30 - July 1, 2012 Moscow.

Group A

 England 36-0 Germany
 Portugal 29-0 Croatia
 England 55-0 Croatia
 Portugal 5-14 Germany
 Germany 26-5 Croatia
 England 50-0 Portugal

Group C

 Netherlands 47-0 Switzerland
 Italy 5-17 Ireland
 Netherlands 14-12 Ireland
 Italy 22-17 Switzerland
 Switzerland 0-41 Ireland
 Netherlands 55-0 Italy

Cup/Plate Quarter-finals
(Winners qualify for World Cup)
England 31-5 Ukraine
Spain 31-5 Germany
Netherlands 0-22 France
Russia 27-0 Ireland

Plate Semi-finals
(Winners qualify for World Cup)
Ireland 17-0 Ukraine
Netherlands 26-5 Germany

7th/8th place
Ukraine 22-0 Germany

Plate final (5th/6th place)
Ireland 7-31 Netherlands

Cup semi-finals
England 24-10 Russia
Spain 24-12 France

3rd/4th place
Russia 24-12 France

Cup final
England 27-7 Spain
Group B

 Spain 38-0 Sweden
 Ukraine 24-0 Scotland
 Spain 36-0 Scotland
 Ukraine 24-7 Sweden
 Sweden 19-22 Scotland
 Spain 35-0 Ukraine

Group D

 France 57-0 Moldova
 Russia 26-0 Wales
 France 33-0 Wales
 Russia 41-0 Moldova
 Moldova 0-52 Wales
 France 7-21 Russia

Bowl/Shield Quarter-finals
Portugal 21-7 Sweden
Scotland 27-0 Croatia
Wales 22-0 Switzerland
Italy 14-0 Moldova

Shield Semi-finals
Switzerland 7-10 Sweden
Moldova 24-0 Croatia

15th/16th place
Switzerland 15-5 Croatia

Shield final(13th/14th place)
Moldova 0-7 Sweden

Bowl semi-finals
Portugal 26-5 Wales
Scotland 22-17 Italy

11th/12th place
Wales 19-14 Italy

Bowl final (9th/10th place)
Portugal 26-5 Scotland

References

Rugby Europe Women's Sevens
2012 rugby sevens competitions
Sevens